The 2016 Ferrari Challenge – Europe is the 23rd season of Ferrari Challenge Europe and its predecessor, Ferrari Challenge Italy. The season consisted of 7 rounds, starting at the Autodromo Nazionale di Monza on April 2 and ending at the Daytona International Speedway on December 3.

Calendar

Entry list 
All teams and drivers used the Ferrari 458 Challenge Evo fitted with Pirelli tyres.

Trofeo Pirelli

Coppa Shell

Results and standings

Race results

Championship standings 
Points were awarded to the top ten classified finishers as follows:

Trofeo Pirelli

Coppa Shell

See also 
 2016 Finali Mondiali

References

External links 
 Official website

Europe 2016
Ferrari Challenge Europe